"Aiii Shot The DJ" is a song by German band Scooter. It was released in August 2001 as the second and final single from their eighth studio album We Bring the Noise!.

Music video
The music video features German comedian Helge Schneider as a DJ in Timmendorfer Strand.

Track listing
CD Single
"Aiii Shot The DJ" [Radio Version] (3:30)
"Aiii Shot The DJ" [Extended Version] (4:52)
"Aiii Shot The DJ" [Bite The Bullet Mix] (6:38)
"Aiii Shot The DJ" Video (Multimedia Part)

12-inch Single
"Aiii Shot The DJ" [Extended Version] (4:52)
"Aiii Shot The DJ" [Bite The Bullet Mix] (6:38)

Download
"Aiii Shot The DJ" [Radio Version] (3:30)
"Aiii Shot The DJ" [Extended Version] (4:52)
"Aiii Shot The DJ" [Bite The Bullet Mix] (6:38)

Chart performance

References

Scooter (band) songs
2001 singles
Songs written by H.P. Baxxter
Songs written by Jens Thele
Songs written by Rick J. Jordan
2001 songs